Cephonodes novebudensis is a moth of the family Sphingidae. It is known from Vanuatu.

The length of the forewings is about 23 mm. It is similar to Cephonodes lifuensis.

References

Cephonodes
Moths described in 1927